Conand may refer to:

 Conand (mythology), a leader of the Fomorians, in Irish mythology
 Conand, Ain, a commune in France